Nguyen Giac Ngo, real name Nguyen Van Nguot (1897–1967), was a Vietnamese military leader, serving as the major general of the Republic of Vietnam Military Forces, and a senior officer of the armed forces of the Hòa Hảo, and one of their religious leaders. Receiving French military training, he stood in he ranks of the Hòa Hảo forces for over a decade. In 1950, he turned to cooperating with the Vietnamese National Army.

Life

Early years 
He was born on 18 May 1897 as Nguyễn Văn Ngượt in the Chợ Mới district of Long Xuyên, in a family of a middle-sized landowners. He worked as a warrant officer in the Long Xuyên municipal police. After meeting Huỳnh Phú Sổ, the founder of the Hòa Hảo sect, in 1940, he changed his name to Nguyễn Giác Ngộ. He became an ardent preacher for the sect, particularly among  law enforcement, where he remained until 1945.

Some Hòa Hảo adepts left their fields in early 1943 and rushed to Thạnh Mỹ Tây to "seek sanctuary." The adepts restored the temple of Linh Lang under the direction of Giác Ngộ, which had been ordered demolished in 1913. However, the presence of tens of thousands of sectarians in Thạnh Mỹ Tây sparked further turmoil. The French ordered the temple's restoration to be halted, and Nguyen Giác Ngộ and other prominent sectaries were taken to Bà Rá camp or Côn Sơn Island. Giác Ngộ returned to the Mekong Delta after being released in 1945 and immediately began forming new armed units.

First Indochina War 
While war was raging in the north, the sect renewed its anti-French and anti-Việt Minh operations in December 1946. They renamed themselves The Thirtieth Nguyen Trung True Division during the reorganization of the Hòa Hảo military forces, and Giác Ngộ was appointed the general-in-chief.

After the death of Sổ in April 1947, the sect began to lose momentum, leading to factionalism, parochialism, and outside organization influence, which caused an increase in violence as the various internal factions engaged in conflicts among themselves. By 1948, Giác Ngộ had left the military to devote his entire life to religious self-improvement, though he returned to military leadership after being appealed by the Vietnamese Democratic Socialist Party, as the other Hòa Hảo generals Trần Văn Soái (1889–1961), Lâm Thành Nguyên (1904–1977), and Ba Cụt were fighting with each other. This frustrated Thành Nguyên and provoked his reconciliation with Soái. Meanwhile, Giác Ngộ was attempting to oust Ba Cụt from the Chợ Mới district. He surrendered immediately to the French colonial authorities after he had accomplished this. Soái was drawn into Chợ Mới by this slight. It took the French until 1950 to persuade him to leave the district under Giác Ngộ's control.

Sect crisis 

During the sect crisis of 1955, 200 people led by Giác Ngộ, and other leaders from Cao Đại, gathered in the Saigon Town Hall to declare the General Assembly of the Democratic and Revolutionary Forces of the Nation. Its members tore down a large photograph of the Emperor Bảo Đại, hurled it out the window, and stomped on it in the street before the meeting started, and proceeded to condemn the French and their allies. The assembly then drafted a list of demands that included Bảo Đại's abdication, the removal of all French forces, and the formation of a new government headed by President Ngô Đình Diệm (1901–1963). They formed a committee to deliver the demands to the government, but when they arrived at the palace, they discovered General Nguyễn Văn Vy (1916–1981) sitting in Diệm's office, declaring that he was taking over the army as Bảo Đại had instructed. Vy was taken hostage and compelled to cancel his plans by several members of the committee. After a paratroop colonel threatened Diệm, he let Vy go, and Vy left the next day for Paris.

References

Sources 

 
 
 
 
 
 
 

1897 births
1967 deaths
Hòa Hảo
People of the First Indochina War
Generals of South Vietnam
Vietnamese generals
Vietnamese anti-communists